Nationality words link to articles with information on the nation's poetry or literature (for instance, Irish or France).

Events
 First printing of Vitsentzos Kornaros's early 17th century Cretan Greek romantic epic poem Erotokritos (Ἐρωτόκριτος), in Venice.

Works published

 Henry Carey, Poems on Several Occasions, including "Sally in our Alley", and "Namby-Pamby", written to ridicule Ambrose Philips
 Samuel Croxall, An original canto of Spencer: design'd as part of his Faerie Queene, but never printed (political satire)
 Abel Evans, Vertumnus
 Anne Finch, countess of Winchelsea, "Written by a Lady", Miscellany Poems on Several Occasions
 John Gay:
 Rural Sports
 The Fan (published this year, although the book states "1714")
 Alexander Pope:
 Ode For Musick
 Ode on St. Cecilia's Day
Windsor-Forest
 Richard Steere, The Daniel Catcher, including "Earth Felicities", a poem in blank verse, an unusual form for the time, and "Caelestial Embassy", a nativity poem that criticized the Puritan rejection of Christmas, English Colonial America
 Jonathan Swift, published anonymously, Part of the Seventh Epistle of the First Book of Horace Imitated
 Joseph Trapp, Peace
 John Wilmot, Earl of Rochester, Poems on Several Occasions. "By the R. H. the E. of R.", London, posthumous
 Edward Young:
 An Epistle to the Right Honourable the Lord Lansdown
 A Poem on the Last Day

Births
Death years link to the corresponding "[year] in poetry" article:
 September 13 – Giuseppe Maria Buondelmonti (died 1757), Italian poet, orator and philosopher
 September 18 – Samuel Cobb (born 1675), English poet and critic
 December 18 (bapt.) – Thomas Gilbert (died 1766), English satirical poet and rake
 Luise Adelgunde Victoria Gottsched (died 1762), German
 Khwaja Muhammad Zaman (died 1774), Indian, Sindhi-language poet
 1713 or 1714 – George Smith of Chichester (died 1776), English landscape painter and poet

Deaths
Birth years link to the corresponding "[year] in poetry" article:
 February 14 – William Harrison (born 1685), English poet and diplomat
 May 20 – Thomas Sprat (born 1635), English bishop and poet
 September 6 – François-Séraphin Régnier-Desmarais (born 1632), French ecclesiastic, grammarian, diplomat and poet in French, Spanish and Latin

See also

Poetry
List of years in poetry
List of years in literature
 18th century in poetry
 18th century in literature
 Augustan poetry
 Scriblerus Club

Notes

 "A Timeline of English Poetry" Web page of the Representative Poetry Online Web site, University of Toronto

18th-century poetry
Poetry